John Falconor Black (February 23, 1890 – March 20, 1962), was a Major League Baseball first baseman who played in  with the St. Louis Browns.

External links

1890 births
1962 deaths
Major League Baseball catchers
Baseball players from Kentucky
St. Louis Browns players
Sportspeople from Covington, Kentucky